= Bon pour l'Orient =

Bon pour l'Orient (good enough for the Orient) is a French condescending term that refers to the stamps affixed in the 19th century to the diplomas of students coming from colonial or Ottoman territories. These students were subjected to a less intensive level of education in Western educational institutions and obtained degrees which, despite being useless in Europe, were deemed good enough to secure employment in the colonies.

In modern use, the phrase pejoratively describes practices which although unacceptable in advanced Western countries, might be thought appropriate for less developed countries.
